Viorst is a surname. Notable people with the surname include:

 Judith Viorst (born 1931), American writer and journalist
 Milton Viorst (1930–2022), American journalist